The National Technical Research Organisation (NTRO) is a technical intelligence agency under the National Security Advisor in the Prime Minister's Office, India. It was set up in 2004.  

It has the same "norms of conduct" as the Intelligence Bureau (IB) and the Research and Analysis Wing (R&AW).

History
The National Technical Research Organisation (NTRO), originally known as the National Technical Facilities Organisation (NTFO), is a highly specialised technical intelligence gathering agency. While the agency does not affect the working of technical wings of various intelligence agencies, including those of the Indian Armed Forces, it acts as a super-feeder agency for providing technical intelligence to other agencies on internal and external security. The Group of Ministers (GOM) headed by then Deputy Prime Minister L K Advani had recommended the constitution of the NTFO as a state-of-the-art technical wing of intelligence gathering. Due to security concerns, the recommendation along with such other matters were not made public when the GOM report was published. The organisation does hi-tech surveillance jobs, including satellite monitoring, terrestrial monitoring, internet monitoring, considered vital for the national security apparatus. The officials have identified countries from where such gadgets could be procured but refused to reveal them due to 'security and other implications'. The Government had been working in this direction after the Kargil war in 1999 when the Subrahmanyam committee report pointed out weaknesses in intelligence gathering in the national security set up. Sources said the road-map for constitution of the National Technical Facilities Organisation was prepared by Dr A P J Abdul Kalam in October 2001 when he was the Principal Scientific Adviser. It was subsequently mentioned in the Group of Ministers report on internal security.

In September 2013, Madhya Pradesh government allotted 180 hectares of land to set up the NTRO at Borda village near Bhopal.

NTRO has been one of the most proactive members of US NSA-led 10-member counter-terrorism platform called SIGINT Seniors Pacific (SSPAC) for the last 10 years, a recent tranche of classified documents recently released by whistleblower Edward Snowden to a website suggests.

Organization
The agency specializes in multiple disciplines, which include remote sensing, SIGINT, data gathering and processing, cyber security, geospatial information gathering, cryptology, strategic hardware and software development and strategic monitoring.

The National Critical Information Infrastructure Protection Centre, an agency under the control of National Technical Research Organisation, has been created to monitor, intercept and assess threats to crucial infrastructure and other vital installations from intelligence gathered using sensors and platforms which include satellites, underwater buoys, drones, VSAT-terminal locators and fiber-optic cable nodal tap points.

It also includes National Institute of Cryptology Research and Development (NICRD), which is first of its kind in Asia.

NTRO operates from Technology Experiment Satellite(TES), Cartosat-2A, EMISAT and Cartosat-2B besides two Radar Imaging Satellites namely RISAT-1 & RISAT-2.  RISAT-2 was acquired from Israel at a cost $110 million and placed into orbit using a PSLV launcher in 2009.

NTRO, along with IAF operates a number of Very Long Range Tracking Radar (VLRTR) systems. VLRTR are used  for Missile  Monitoring and detection of spaceborne threats in aid of Ballistic Missile Defence. These VLRTR sites are located at Udaipur, Bhopal and Balasore.

It also operates India's ocean surveillance ship named INS Dhruv, with Indian Navy.

Activities

In December 2014, based on comint provided by NTRO, Indian Coast Guard intercepted a Pakistani fishing boat in Arabian Sea near Indo-Pakistan maritime boundary, approximately 365 km from Porbander. After few hours of chase and standoff, coast guard fired at the boat thus killing all the 4 occupants. Coast Guard officials stated that the occupants were terrorists and were on their way to undertake a 26/11-type attack.

During the 2016 Line of Control strike, NTRO played an important role by providing Satellite intelligence to operational advisors and planners. Cartosat-2C, Cartosat-1, Resourcesat-2 satellites operated by NTRO, were used to provide the imagery of terrorist training camps in Pakistan-administered Kashmir.

During 2019 Balakot airstrike, NTRO also played an important role. NTRO surveillance confirmed 300 targets via active mobile connections in Markaz Syed Ahmad Shaheed training camp, just few days before IAF airstrike.

Controversies
 In September 2007, an article appeared in India Today detailing the difficulties faced by the NTRO, specifically how the other spying agencies of the Govt. of India are not allowing the NTRO to fulfill its duties.
 In February 2010, Indian Express reported that NTRO has become the first Indian Intelligence Agency to be audited by the Comptroller and Auditor General of India (CAG) and an investigation by the Central Vigilance Commission (CVC).
 In April 2010, an Outlook India article (issue dated 3 May 2010), detailed further the issues plaguing the organisation, chiefly the issues of nepotism, inefficiency and corruption amidst the telephone tapping scandal.
An internal enquiry was ordered by PMO to find out if there has been a case of financial corruption.
 The Supreme Court of India, has ordered a probe into the allegations of financial irregularities in the procurement of military hardware. The lawsuit was filed by a whistleblower VK Mittal, who resigned as a senior scientist of NTRO and pursued initiatives to unmask the officers behind the  scandals. The court also observed that it might have to monitor the investigation, given the nature of allegations which point to systemic corruption in the procurement of surveillance equipment. In later proceedings Supreme court of India clarified its stand on the progress of the investigation
 In September 2011, an article appeared in The Times of India about how the spy agency had to force an officer 'to quit in 2007 after he used counter-intelligence equipment, including a hidden camera, to bug the bathroom of its security and counter-intelligence director in NTRO headquarters in Delhi. The official was found guilty of placing a hidden, 'pin-hole' camera in the bathroom and linking it to his office computer. The bathroom, located on the second floor of the building, was used by not just the counterintelligence director Anil Malhotra but several other officials, including women staffers.' The incident came to light in September 2007 itself, but was hushed up.
 In August 2011, a whistleblower reported that NTRO has tapped 750,000 phones illegally. The matter was hushed up and no investigation was done.
 In April 2013, the department of electronics and information technology (DeitY) accused NTRO of cracking national informatics center (NIC) network.

See also
NATGRID
NETRA
Mass surveillance in India
Central Monitoring System
Telecom Enforcement Resource and Monitoring
Multi Agency Centre (India)
List of Indian intelligence agencies

References

External links
 Govt to DoT: Ensure strict verification for SIMs
 Technical research agency planned in State
 National Technical Research Organisation (NTRO) - Official website

Indian intelligence agencies
Research and Analysis Wing
2004 establishments in Delhi
Cyber Security in India